The Lamont Cranston Band is an American blues band, based in Hamel, Minnesota. It was founded in 1969 by brothers Pat and Larry Hayes and continues today with Pat as the band's frontman. The band is named after the alter ego of the pulp hero The Shadow.

History
"Excuse Moi, Mon Cheri," written by Larry Hayes, was recorded by the Blues Brothers and released as the B-side of their single "Soul Man". In 1981, the band broke into the Billboard charts with their biggest hit "Upper Mississippi Shakedown", The song appears often on Classic Rock and Album Oriented Rock radio stations worldwide.

The band has played with some notable musicians, such as Muddy Waters, Albert King, Stevie Ray Vaughan, Buddy Guy, the Kinks, the Yardbirds, Kansas, Yes and the Blues Brothers. In 1981, they opened for the Rolling Stones on a leg of their North American tour.

Pat Hayes played guest harmonica on a track on Percy Strother's second album, The Highway Is My Home (1995). It was a reworking of Little Walter's tune, "One Of These Mornings."

Band members

Current lineup
Pat Hayes, vocals, guitar, harmonica
Bruce McCabe, piano
Jim Greenwell, saxophone
Brad Pelkey, bass
Jeff Rogers, drums
Rod Smith, guitar
Tim Wick, organ

Previous members
Dick Perna, tenor saxophone
Dave Olausen, guitar
Danny Webb, drums
Joe Sherohman, bass
Jim Novak, drums
Ted Larson, guitar
Ted Sherarts (Teddy Morgan), guitar 
Larry Hayes, guitar
Bob Bingham, guitar
Charles Fletcher, bass
Andy Bailey, piano, Hammond B3 organ 
Dale Petersen, piano, Hammond B3 organ
Jon Preizler, piano, Hammond B3 organ
Aaron Virnig, drums
Brian Risling, saxophone
Billy Shiell, trumpet, flute
Bill Black, bass
Michael Carvale, bass
Charlie Bingham, guitar
Mick Masoff, bass 
Rick O'Dell, saxophone
Tommy Burnevik, saxophone
Pete Masters, trombone
Larry McCabe, trombone
Rico Anderson, drums
Mike DuBois, drums
Jesse Petrowski, bass
John Baker Saunders, bass
Paul Scher, saxophone
Danny Rowles, piano, organ
Greg Shuck, drums
Jason Kotecki, drums
Jeff Rogers, drums
Brad Pelkey, bass
Jason Medeiros, guitar
Rob Arthur, keyboard, guitar
Joe Chandler, Saxophone, guitar

Discography

Albums
The Lamont Cranston Band (1976)
Specials Lit (1977)
El-Cee Notes (1978)
Up from the Alley (1980)
Shakedown (1981)
Bar Wars (1981)
Last Call (1984)
A Measure of Time (1986)
Tiger in Your Tank (1988)
The Lamont Cranston Blues Band featuring Pat Hayes (1991)
Upper Mississippi Shakedown: The Best of the Lamont Cranston Band (1993)
Rock Awhile: The Early Years 1975–1978 (1994)
Roll with Me (1997)
Tiger in Your Tank (1999)
Lamont Live!! (2001)
In the 80's (2009)
Live at the People's Fair 1987 (2010)
Lamont Cranston Band with Bruce McCabe (2012)

Singles
"Aint Nobody Here but Us Chickens"/"Something You Got", Shadow Records (1976)
"Takin' a Chance" / "E Jam", Waterhouse Records 15002 (1979)

References

Musical groups from Minnesota
Musical groups established in 1969